Bailly is a lunar impact crater that is located near the south-west limb of the Moon. It was named after French astronomer Jean S. Bailly. The oblique viewing angle gives the crater a foreshortened appearance, and the location near the limb can limit visibility due to libration. The most favorable time for viewing this feature is near the full moon when the terminator is crossing the crater wall.

Description

This is the largest crater on the near side of the Moon. In area it is comparable in size to a small mare. It lies north of the crater Le Gentil and east of Hausen. Further west of Bailly are the (unofficially named) Montes Dörfel mountains.

Bailly's uneven crater floor has remained free of lava flooding, and it is covered with a multitude of ridges and craters. The entire crater has been battered and worn, and the outer ramparts are eroded and in some places have even been worn away by myriad impacts. If the crater ever possessed a central peak, it is no longer discernible. Due to its current condition, observers have termed this feature a 'field of ruins'.

Due to the size and the worn state of this crater, it is estimated to be more than 3 billion years old, and is part of the Nectarian system.

Satellite craters 
The south-eastern part of the crater is home to two notable craters, designated Bailly A and Bailly B. These craters overlap, and Bailly A lies across the rim of Bailly's mountainous wall. Selenographer Giovanni Battista Riccioli named Bailly B, Bartolus for fellow Ferrarese Jesuit Daniello Bartoli (1608-1685) in his Almagestum novum (1651). The name was not recognized by the IAU.

References

External links

 

Impact craters on the Moon
Nectarian